The Main Political and Educational Committee of the People's Commissariat of Education of the Russian Socialist Federative Soviet Republic was a state authority, which, as the Main Directorate, was part of the People's Commissariat of Education of the Russian Socialist Federative Soviet Republic.

History
It was established by decree of the Council of People's Commissars on November 12, 1920 on the basis of the out-of-school department of the People's Commissariat of Education.

The task of the Main Political and Educational Committee was to guide political, educational and propaganda work in the spirit of the ideals of the Communist Party. The Main Political and Educational Committee was in charge of reading houses, clubs, libraries, adult schools, Soviet-party schools, communist universities and more.

The chairman of the Main Political and Educational Committee during the whole period of its work was Nadezhda Krupskaya.

In June 1930, the Main Political and Educational Committee was reorganized into the mass work sector of the People's Commissariat of Education of the Russian Socialist Federative Soviet Republic.

Sources
Glavpolitprosvet // Soviet Historical Encyclopedia
Glavpolitprosvet // Gazlift – Gogolevo – Moscow: Soviet Encyclopedia, 1971 – (Great Soviet Encyclopedia: in 30 Volumes / Editor-in-Chief Alexander Prokhorov; 1969–1978, Volume 6)
Nadezhda Krupskaya. On Cultural and Educational Work. Selected Articles and Speeches, Moscow, 1965
Fedor Panachin. Glavpolitprosvet // Pedagogical Dictionary

Organizations based in the Soviet Union
Censorship in the Soviet Union
Censorship in Russia
Government agencies established in 1920